Advanced Placement (AP) French Literature (also called AP French Literature or AP French Lit) was an Advanced Placement course and examination offered by the College Board. The course was designed to replicate a college French literature course for high school students. Students studied a variety of novels, plays, and poetry, all written in French.

Due to the low numbers of students taking AP French Literature, it was discontinued after the 2008–2009 year.

Required reading
The works required by the College Board for the 2008 exam were:

 Moderato Cantabile by Marguerite Duras
 Le Cid by Pierre Corneille
 Candide by Voltaire
 Une Tempête (A Tempest) by Aimé Césaire
 Pierre et Jean (Pierre and Jean) by Guy de Maupassant
 L'École des femmes (The School for Wives) by Molière
 Poems by Charles Baudelaire, Jean de la Fontaine, Joachim du Bellay, Guillaume Apollinaire, and Louise Labé.

Grade distributions
In 2007, 2,068 students took the exam from 478 schools. The mean score was 3.30 with a standard deviation of 1.34.

The grade distribution for 2007 was:

References

External links
 AP French Literature at CollegeBoard.com

Schools of French as a second or foreign language
Advanced Placement
French-language literature
Literary education